Cardamyla carinentalis is a species of snout moth in the genus Cardamyla. It was described by Francis Walker in 1859, and is known from the northern half of Australia, including Queensland and New South Wales.

References

Moths described in 1859
Pyralini